Three vessels of the United States Navy have been named USS Venture:

 The first  was a steam yacht leased by the Navy from 1917 to 1919.
 The second  was also a yacht, originally built in 1931, acquired at the end of December 1941, used for patrols and convoys along the East Coast, and sold in 1946.
 The third  was a minesweeper in service from 1956 to 1971.

United States Navy ship names